Gustave E. Steinback (1878–1959) was an American architect practicing in New York City in the early and mid twentieth century. He was particularly known as a designer of Roman Catholic schools and churches. His offices were located at 157 West 74th Street in the 1920s, and in Stamford, Connecticut in the 1940s.

Early life and career
Steinback was sent to Germany for his elementary education. He later studied at the Polytechnic Institute of Brooklyn, New York City, and later received a B.S. from Columbia School of Architecture in New York City, class of 1900. After graduation, he traveled throughout Europe, spent three years in Germany, and one year in France working for Atelier Bernard.

He claimed at the end of his career to have started his practice in 1903 but this may have been a mistake, as he had earlier claimed 1904 as his first year. In 1904, he entered into a partnership with fellow Columbia graduate Robert J. Reiley. The firm, known as Reiley and Steinback continued in practice from 1904 through 1913 and was responsible for many buildings for Roman Catholic clients throughout the Eastern United States.

Architectural practice
After the partnership was dissolved, both men went on to lengthy careers designing Roman Catholic churches.
He was licensed to practice architecture in New Jersey in 1905, and in New York in 1916, suggesting he only had to get his New York license after his partnership was dissolved with the more successful Reiley. He was an associate of the American Institute of Architects until 1931. He was also a member of the Associated Stamford Architects.

Personal life
Steinback was active in civic affairs and was for many years a member of the Stamford City Planning Board. He died at Stamford Hospital on September 21, 1959 from injuries sustained when he was struck by an automobile.

Unlike many other of his contemporaries, Steinback continued to work in private practice during World War I, not completing any government service until World War II when he worked on engineering on Stewart's Field and at Rye Lake Airport.

Work as Reiley and Steinback (1904-1913)
 1908: The Basilica of St. Stanislaus, Bishop & Martyr, Chicopee, Massachusetts
1909: Our Lady of Mt. Carmel, Bayonne, NJ
 1912: Church of the Queen of All Saints, at Lafayette and Vanderbilt Avenues in Fort Greene, Brooklyn,
 St. Stanislaus Church, Adams, Massachusetts
 St. Stanislaus' Church, Meriden, Connecticut
 St. Aloysius' Church, Great Neck, New York

Works as Gustave E. Steinback (1913-1959)
 1917: Blessed Sacrament Church, Manhattan, New York City,
 1915: St. Patrick's Church, Bayshore, New York
 1918: Cathedral College, Brooklyn, New York
 1918: Church of St. Anselm, 151st Street at Robbins Avenue, Mott Haven, Bronx, New York City
 1920: St. Ephram's School and Hall, Brooklyn, New York
 1921: St. Michael's Church, Brooklyn, New York
 1921: (former) Church of Our Lady of Guadalupe, 14th Street, Manhattan, New York City, facade by Steinback
 1922: St. Monica's School and Convent, Jamaica, Queens, New York City
 1922: St. Ignatius School and Hall, Hicksville, New York
 1922: St. Eamun's School and Hall, Brooklyn, New York
 1923: Church of the Presentation, Queens, New York
 1924: St. Mels High School, Chicago, Illinois
 1925: Quigley Memorial Seminary, Chicago, Illinois (with Zachary Taylor Davis of Chicago)
 1925: St. Pancras' Church, Brooklyn, New York
 1928: St. Joseph College for Women, Brooklyn, New York
 1928: Church of Our Lady Queen of Martyrs, 91 Arden Street, Washington Heights, Manhattan, New York City
 1928: St. Joan of Arc Church, Jackson Heights, Queens, New York City,  never built, only the crypt/lower church completed
 1931: St. Benedict's School, Bronx, New York
 1932: St. Bernard's School and Rectory, White Plains, New York
 1939: St. John the Evangelist's Church and Parish School, Leonia, New Jersey
 1949: Church of Immaculate Heart of Mary, Scarsdale, New York
 1949: Church of the Annunciation, Crestwood, New York
 1949-51: Our Lady Queen of Martyrs Parish School
 1950: St. Cecelia's Church, Stamford, Connecticut
 1951: Mary Queen of Heaven School, Brooklyn, New York
 1951: St. Paul the Apostle School, Yonkers, New York
 1951: Saints Peter and Paul Church and School, Mount Vernon, New York
 1956: St. Catherine of Sienna's Church, Riverside, Connecticut

Gallery

References
Notes

External links

Architects from New York City
Architects from Connecticut
Architects of Roman Catholic churches
American ecclesiastical architects
Columbia Graduate School of Architecture, Planning and Preservation alumni
Gothic Revival architects

1878 births
1959 deaths
Artists from Stamford, Connecticut
American expatriates in Germany